Frederick Francis I (10 December 1756 – 1 February 1837) ruled over the German state of Mecklenburg-Schwerin, first as duke (1785–1815), and then as grand duke (1815–1837).

Biography

He was born in Schwerin, Duchy of Mecklenburg-Schwerin, to Duke Louis of Mecklenburg-Schwerin and Princess Charlotte Sophie of Saxe-Coburg-Saalfeld. Friedrich Franz succeeded his uncle Friedrich as duke of Mecklenburg-Schwerin in 1785.

Following the Napoleonic Wars, Friedrich Franz was raised to the dignity of grand duke at the Congress of Vienna. Along with his cousin in Mecklenburg-Strelitz, he was known as one of the most reactionary German rulers.  On his death in 1837 he was succeeded by his grandson, Grand Duke Paul Friedrich.

Marriage and children
On 1 June 1775 in Gotha, Friedrich Franz married Princess Louise of Saxe-Gotha-Altenburg. They had eight children:
Daughter (stillborn 7 May 1776), buried in the Schelfkirche St. Nikolai of Schwerin.
Son (stillborn 11 May 1777), buried in the Schelfkirche St. Nikolai of Schwerin.
Friedrich Ludwig (13 June 1778 – 29 November 1819).  He married Grand Duchess Elena Pavlovna of Russia, a daughter of Paul I of Russia and Sophie Marie Dorothea of Württemberg
Louise Charlotte (19 November 1779 – 4 January 1801). Married Emil Leopold August, Duke of Saxe-Gotha-Altenburg
Gustav Wilhelm (31 January 1781 – 10 January 1851).
Karl (2 July 1782 – 22 May 1833).
Charlotte Frederica (4 December 1784 – 13 July 1840). Married Christian VIII of Denmark. They were parents to Frederick VII of Denmark.
Adolf (18 December 1785 – 8 May 1821).

Ancestry

References

 

 

1756 births
1837 deaths
People from Schwerin
Dukes of Mecklenburg-Schwerin
House of Mecklenburg-Schwerin
Protestant monarchs
Grand Dukes of Mecklenburg-Schwerin
German landowners